Falcidius is a genus of planthoppers in the family Issidae.

Distribution
This genus includes 10 species distributed only in the Mediterranean region: Morocco, Algeria, Tunisia, Malta, Southern Italy (including Sicily), and Southern France.

Species 
 Falcidius apterus (Fabricius, 1794)
 Falcidius chlorizans (Rey, 1891)
 Falcidius diphtheriopsis Bergevin, 1919
 Falcidius doriae (Ferrari, 1884)
 Falcidius duffelsicus Dlabola, 1982
 Falcidius ebejeri Gnezdilov & Wilson, 2008
 Falcidius hannibal Gnezdilov & Wilson, 2008
 Falcidius limbatus (A. Costa, 1864)
 Falcidius marocanus Bergevin, 1923
 Falcidius scipionis Gnezdilov & Wilson, 2008

References 

Hysteropterinae
Insects of North Africa
Hemiptera of Europe
Auchenorrhyncha genera